In music, an all-interval twelve-tone row, series, or chord, is a twelve-tone tone row arranged so that it contains one instance of each interval within the octave, 1 through 11 (an ordering of every interval, 0 through 11, that contains each (ordered) pitch-interval class, 0 through 11). A "twelve-note spatial set made up of the eleven intervals [between consecutive pitches]." There are 1,928 distinct all-interval twelve-tone rows. These sets may be ordered in time or in register. "Distinct" in this context means in transpositionally and rotationally normal form (yielding 3856 such series), and disregarding inversionally related forms.
These 1,928 tone rows have been independently rediscovered several times, their first computation probably was by Andre Riotte in 1961, see.

Since the sum of numbers 1 through 11 equals 66, an all-interval row must contain a tritone between its first and last notes, as well as in their middle.

Examples

Mother chord

The first known all-interval row, F, E, C, A, G, D, A, D, E, G, B, C, was named the Mutterakkord (mother chord) by Fritz Heinrich Klein, who created it in 1921 for his chamber-orchestra composition Die Maschine.

 0 e 7 4 2 9 3 8 t 1 5 6

The intervals between consecutive pairs of notes are the following (t = 10, e = 11):

  e 8 9 t 7 6 5 2 3 4 1

Klein used the Mother chord in his Die Maschine, Op. 1, and derived it from the Pyramid chord [Pyramidakkord]:
 0 0 e 9 6 2 9 3 8 0 3 5 6
difference
    e t 9 8 7 6 5 4 3 2 1
by transposing the underlined notes (0369) down two semitones. The Pyramid chord consists of every interval stacked, low to high, from 12 to 1 and while it contains all intervals, it does not contain all pitch classes and is thus not a tone row. Klein chose the name Mutterakkord in order to avoid a longer term such as all-interval twelve-tone row and because it is a chord which unites all other chords by containing them within itself.

The Mother chord row was also used by Alban Berg in his Lyric Suite (1926) and in his second setting of Theodor Storm's poem Schliesse mir die Augen beide.

In contrast, the chromatic scale only contains the interval 1 between each consecutive note:
 0 1 2 3 4 5 6 7 8 9 t e
  1 1 1 1 1 1 1 1 1 1 1
and is thus not an all-interval row.

Grandmother chord

The Grandmother chord is an eleven-interval, twelve-note, invertible chord with all of the properties of the Mother chord. Additionally, the intervals are so arranged that they alternate odd and even intervals (counted by semitones) and that the odd intervals successively decrease by one whole-tone while the even intervals successively increase by one whole-tone. It was invented by Nicolas Slonimsky on February 13, 1938.

     0   e   1   t   2   9   3   8   4   7   5   6
      \ / \ / \ / \ / \ / \ / \ / \ / \ / \ / \ /
 odd:  e   |   9   |   7   |   5   |   3   |   1
 even:     2       4       6       8       t

Link chords

'Link' chords are all-interval twelve-tone sets containing one or more uninterrupted instances of the all-trichord hexachord ({012478}). Found by John F. Link, they have been used by Elliott Carter in pieces such as Symphonia.
 0 1 4 8 7 2 e 9 3 5 t 6
  1 3 4 e 7 9 t 6 2 5 8
 0 4 e 5 2 1 3 8 9 7 t 6
  4 7 6 9 e 2 5 1 t 3 8
There are four 'Link' chords which are RI-invariant.
 0 t 3 e 2 1 7 8 5 9 4 6
  t 5 8 3 e 6 1 9 4 7 2

 0 t 9 5 8 1 7 2 e 3 4 6
  t e 8 3 5 6 7 9 4 1 2

See also
All-interval tetrachord

References

Further reading
Bauer-Mendelberg, Stefan, and Melvin Ferentz (1965). "On Eleven-Interval Twelve-Tone Rows", Perspectives of New Music 3/2: 93–103.
Cohen, David (1972–73). "A Re-examination of All-Interval Rows", Proceedings of the American Society of University Composers 7/8: 73–74.

External links

Chords
Twelve-tone technique

sl:Materin akord